Heliomata glarearia is a moth of the family Geometridae and subfamily Ennominae. The species was first described by Michael Denis and Ignaz Schiffermüller in 1775.

It is found throughout the central and southern Europe and the Near East.

The wingspan is about 20–24 mm. Adults are on wing from May until August.

The larvae mainly feed on Medicago falcata.

External links
Fauna Europaea

Lepiforum e. V.

Geometrinae
Moths of Europe
Moths of Asia
Taxa named by Michael Denis
Taxa named by Ignaz Schiffermüller
Moths described in 1775